Richard William Timm (March 2, 1923 – September 11, 2020) was a Catholic Priest, educator, zoologist, and development worker. He was the Superior of the Congregation of Holy Cross in Dhaka and a member of the Sacred Heart of Jesus Province. He was also one of the founders of Notre Dame College in Dhaka, Bangladesh. He was the 6th principal (1970 to 1972) of Notre Dame College.

Born with German ancestry from both sides on March 2, 1923, in Michigan City, Indiana, USA, Timm is the second of four siblings – elder brother Bob, who died on Okinawa in World War II, and younger sisters Mary Jo Schiel and Genevieve Gantner.

Research works
Timm, as a biologist, conducted exclusive surveys on Nematodes and discovered over 250 new species.

Timm's scientific expeditions involved a landscape spanning from Antarctica Penguin Colonies to the Mangrove of South Asia. Many of his expeditions were confined in the area of the Sundarbans and other parts of South Asia but he covered many other parts of the world as well. His other expeditions include Africa, Europe, Antarctica and The Americas.

Among others, Timm described the following taxa:
 Timmia parva – marine nematode.
 Two varieties of Aphelenchoides – marine nematodes with Dr. Mary Franklyn.
 Imponema, Filiponema and Plutellonema – three new genera of earth nematodes with Dr. Armand Maggenti.
 Two varieties of Megadontolaimus – a marine nematode genus from Cox's Bazar.
 The genus, Metasabatieria, together with its type species, Metasabatieria primigena, from the Bay of Bengal.
His zoological author abbreviation is Timm.

Works in spreading education

Since 1952, Timm has been working in the education sector of first the east Bengal province of Pakistan and then Bangladesh. He was a recognized person for the operations of Notre Dame College, Dhaka, Bangladesh. Founded in November 1949, the college is still carrying on with its reputation and quality and is one of the best educational institutions in Bangladesh by the official ranking. He also took the responsibility of the Principal of Notre Dame College for the term 1970-71 and worked as the Director of Studies as well. He was still connected to the college though not taking part in academic activities. He is also the founder of the Science Departments in Notre Dame College and the pioneer for the club activities. He is also the founder of both Notre Dame Debating Club and Notre Dame Science Club which are the first debating club and the first science club in Bangladesh.

The Textbook of College Biology is a writing of Timm that served as a textbook for East Pakistani – Bangladeshi schools for many years. This text is actually an extension of a book by A. Bhuya of Dhaka Government College but not much of the original version was preserved in the extension. A Laboratory Manual for College Biology was a predecessor for the text, though didn't have the popularity due to the comparatively higher price.

Social development activities

Timm was the first planning officer of Christian Organization for Relief and Rehabilitation(CORR) in 1970. He became the Director when the organization renamed itself to Caritas Bangladesh. He guided the formation of The Association of the Development Agencies in Bangladesh (ADAB) which later became the association of more than 130 NGOs of Bangladesh. He is considered to be the Father of NGO in Bangladesh.

He served the Justice and Peace Commission as the executive secretary for almost 23 years from its inception in 1974.He conducted a study on over 1000 workers from 51 export-oriented ready-made garment factories while serving the JPC as the executive secretary. He evaluated the pay scale, freedom of association, maternity leave of the workers with the help of the students of Notre Dame College, Dhaka and Holy Cross College, Dhaka; later, the results were published on the mainstream media in Bangladesh. He visited the Chittagong Hill Tracts and authored three books where he focused on the deprivation of land rights of the indigenous people of those areas. He revealed the confidential plan of the Bangladesh Govt. to rehabilitate 200 poor families from different areas of Bangladesh to the hill tracts; the govt. allegedly sent letters to each district of the country to provide land of 5 to 10 acres to each family; and later, these families were alleged to take land from the indigenous inhabitants forcefully, where the army and the local governing structures allegedly helped them due to the local politics - according to his books. He founded the South Asia Forum for Human Rights(SAFHR) was the chief of it for 3 years at a stretch. He also founded CORR The Jute Works. 

Timm founded the Coordinator Council for Human Rights in Bangladesh (CCHRB) served as the president for three terms till 1993. He also worked with Justice KM Sobhan to assess the human rights  in Myanmar, specially the human rights violation of the local workers deployed in the extension of the pipeline of Yadana Gas Field and presented the results to the Committee on International Relations of the US House of Representatives.

Activities during the Liberation War of Bangladesh

Activities during the war
Timm expressed his opinion about the incidents and against the genocide on the liberation war of Bangladesh through his writing. He emphasized the difficult situations of civilians and the violation of human rights. His letters written to Rohde served to build public opinion around the world and especially in United States against the war in Bangladesh.

He also conducted relief works for the distressed at the time of the war.

Activities on reconstruction
After the liberation war of Bangladesh, Timm actively took part in the newborn country's reconstruction work together with the UN, USAID, CORR (The Christian Organization for Relief and Rehabilitation, later Caritas) and CRS. The rehabilitation effort was conducted among the homeless and those who have lost all in the war.

Disaster response
On November 12, 1970, a great cyclone struck the coastal areas of East Pakistan and killed at least 50,000 people. Timm, assisted by the students of Notre Dame College, CORR (The Christian Organization for Relief and Rehabilitation, later Caritas) and HELP (Heartland Emergency Life-Saving Project), conducted several relief expeditions in the affected areas. The response was among the biggest of those taken by Non-government people.

On other disasters, including the great flood of 1998, Notre Dame College and Caritas both participated in the relief effort both in and out of Dhaka City under the participation and influence of Timm.

Death
Timm died in South Bend, Indiana on September 11, 2020.

Publications
Timm's publications include numerous research papers and books.

Books
 
 The Plant-Parasitic Nematodes of Thailand and The Philippines published by SEATO in 1965

Awards and recognitions

Timm was awarded the Ramon Magsaysay Award in 1987 for International Understanding.

In response to his activities for development, Timm was honored with the citizenship from three different governments.

Among the many varieties of Nematodes he discovered, the Marine Nematode Timmia parva was named after Timm himself.

See also 
 List of Ramon Magsaysay Award winners

References

External links

 Ramon Magsaysay Award Citation for Richard Timm
 Biography of R. W. Timm at www.rmaward.asia
 Biography of R. W. Timm at nemaplex.ucdavis.edu

1923 births
2020 deaths
20th-century zoologists
American people of German descent
American emigrants to Pakistan
Bangladeshi educators
Bangladeshi Christians
Bangladeshi people of German descent
Naturalised citizens of Bangladesh
Congregation of Holy Cross
University of Notre Dame alumni
Bangladeshi zoologists
21st-century zoologists
People from Michigan City, Indiana
Academic staff of Notre Dame College, Dhaka
Catholic University of America alumni
Nematologists
University of California faculty
American Roman Catholic missionaries
Bangladeshi activists
Bangladeshi microbiologists
American marine biologists
American microbiologists
Writers from Indiana